The Smoking, Health and Social Care (Scotland) Act 2005 (asp 13) is an Act of the Scottish Parliament passed in 2005, after being introduced by Scottish Executive Health minister Andy Kerr.

The Act established that, from 26 March 2006, it would be an offence to smoke in any wholly or substantially enclosed public space in Scotland, with a small number of exceptions, such as: prisons, care homes and police interview rooms. Private member clubs were not exempted. Hotel rooms could be designated by the proprietors as smoking rooms, but they were under no obligation to do so, and if they did not, the Act applied to them as any other space.

It passed on 30 June 2005 with an 83 to 15 vote, with only the Scottish Conservatives opposing, and received Royal Assent on 5 August 2005.

Since the ban came into force on 26 March 2006, it has been largely accepted by the vast majority of the Scottish public.  Compliance rates have been high, and as of 14 June 2006, only one premises has been fined for permitting smoking, and that happened on the day the Act came into being.  Additionally, the Swallow Group of hotels, who had launched a legal challenge to the legislation, formally abandoned their attempt on 13 June 2006, after being advised that it would not succeed.

Cigarette litter continues to be a problem outside premises; especially bars and restaurants, and Environmental Health Officers have become more proactive in fining people dropping cigarette ends. Phone calls to Smokeline (a smoking support line run by NHS Health Scotland) increased before and after the ban and smoking cessation services have reported that their number of clients has increased since the ban came into force.

ASH Scotland was one of the main campaigners for smoke-free legislation, and recognition of their role was confirmed when Maureen Moore (Chief Executive of ASH Scotland) received an OBE  in June 2006 for services to  healthcare.

Smoking in enclosed public spaces was later banned in England and Wales by the Health Act 2006, and in Northern Ireland by the Smoking (Northern Ireland) Order 2006.

See also
 Smoking in the United Kingdom
Tobacco Control

External links
http://www.clearingtheairscotland.com/ Scottish Executive site about the ban
Tobacco Information Scotland Portal which provides information on tobacco control in Scotland, includes a guide to Scotland's smoke-free legislation
ASH Scotland Voluntary organisation which lobbied for smoke-free legislation in Scotland and works to educate the people of Scotland about the dangers of tobacco

UK Legislation

Health law in Scotland
Acts of the Scottish Parliament 2005
Tobacco control
Smoking in the United Kingdom